The 2008–09 season of the NOFV-Oberliga was the first season of the league at tier five (V) of the German football league system after the introduction of the 3. Liga in Germany.

The NOFV-Oberliga is split into two divisions, the NOFV-Oberliga Nord and the NOFV-Oberliga Süd. The champions of both divisions,  Tennis Borussia Berlin and ZFC Meuselwitz, were directly promoted to the 2009–10 Regionalliga Nord.

North

Top goalscorers

South

Top goalscorers

External links 
 NOFV-Online – official website of the North-East German Football Association 

NOFV-Oberliga seasons
NOFV